The Fike Model D was a light aircraft built in the United States in the early 1950s. Designed by airline pilot William Fike, it was a conventional high-wing strut-braced monoplane with tailskid undercarriage and seating for one or two people in an enclosed cabin. In appearance, the aircraft strongly resembled a Piper Cub, with only the tail surfaces sourced from one. An unusual feature was that the flight controls were mounted to the ceiling of the cabin, rather than the floor.  This facilitated the folding or removal of the seat or seats to enable the aircraft's use as a sleeping space when camping with it. Plans were marketed for homebuilding.

Specifications

References

 
 
 aerofiles.com

1950s United States sport aircraft
Homebuilt aircraft
D
Single-engined tractor aircraft
High-wing aircraft
Aircraft first flown in 1951